The 1935–36 Connecticut State Huskies men's basketball team represented Connecticut State College, now the University of Connecticut, in the 1935–36 collegiate men's basketball season. The Huskies completed the season with a 3–11 overall record. The Huskies were members of the New England Conference, where they ended the season with a 0–3 record. The Huskies played their home games at Hawley Armory in Storrs, Connecticut, and were led by fifth-year head coach John J. Heldman, Jr. and first-year head coach J.O. Christian.

Schedule 

|-
!colspan=12 style=""| Regular Season

Schedule Source:

References 

UConn Huskies men's basketball seasons
Connecticut
1935 in sports in Connecticut
1936 in sports in Connecticut